Pygopodoidea is a gecko superfamily and the only taxon in the gekkotan subclade Pygopodomorpha. The clade includes three Australasian families: Diplodactylidae (stone geckos), Carphodactylidae (knob-tailed geckos), and Pygopodidae (flap-footed geckos). Traditional gekkotan systematics had considered Diplodactylidae and Carphodactylidae as subfamilies of the family Gekkonidae, but recent molecular work have placed Pygopodidae within Gekkonidae making it paraphyletic. These analyses have shown support of Pygopodidae and Carphodactylidae being sister taxa, with Diplodactylidae occupying a basal position in Pygopodoidea.

Below is a taxonomic list of pygopodoid genera in taxonomic order:
Pygopodomorpha (Vidal & Hedges, 2009)
Pygopodoidea (Gray, 1845)
Diplodactylidae (Underwood, 1954) – Stone Geckos
Crenadactylus (Dixon & Kluge, 1964) – Clawless Gecko
Nebulifera (Oliver, Bauer, Greenbaum, Jackman & Hobbie, 2012) – Robust Velvet Gecko
Amalosia (Wells & Wellington, 1984) – Amalosian Velvet Geckos
Oedura (J. E. Gray, 1842) – Oeduran Velvet Geckos
Hesperoedura (Oliver, Bauer, Greenbaum, Jackman & Hobbie, 2012) – Reticulated Velvet Gecko
Strophurus (Fitzinger, 1843) – Spiny-tailed Geckos
Diplodactylus (Gray, 1832) – Stone Geckos
Rhynchoedura (Günther, 1867) – Beaked Geckos
Lucasium (Wermuth, 1965) – Ground Geckos
Toropuku (Nielsen, Bauer, Jackman, Hitchmough & Daugherty, 2011) – New Zealand Striped Gecko
Naultinus (Gray, 1842) – New Zealand Green Geckos
Tukutuku (Nielsen, Bauer, Jackman, Hitchmough & Daugherty, 2011) – Harlequin Gecko
Dactylocnemis (Steindachner, 1867) – Pacific Geckos
Mokopirirakau (Nielsen, Bauer, Jackman, Hitchmough & Daugherty, 2011) – Forest Geckos
Woodworthia (Garman, 1901) – Woodworth's Geckos
Hoplodactylus (Fitzinger, 1843) – Hoplodactyl Geckos
Pseudothecadactylus (Brongersma, 1936) – Cave Geckos
Bavayia (Roux, 1913) – Bavay's Geckos
Paniegekko (Bauer, Jackman, Sadlier & Whitaker, 2012) – Panié du Massif Gecko
Dierogekko (Bauer, Jackman, Sadlier & Whitaker, 2006) – New Caledonian Striped Geckos
Oedodera (Bauer, Jackman, Sadlier & Whitaker, 2006) – Marbled Gecko
Correlophus (Guichenot, 1866) – Correloph Geckos
Rhacodactylus (Fitzinger, 1843) – Rhacodactyl Geckos
Mniarogekko (Bauer, Whitaker, Sadlier & Jackman, 2012) – Mossy Geckos
Eurydactylodes (Wermuth, 1965) – New Caledonian Chameleon Geckos
Carphodactylidae (Kluge, 1967) – Knob-tailed Geckos
Phyllurus (Schinz, 1822) – Phyllur Leaf-tailed Geckos
Saltuarius (Couper, Covacevich & Moritz, 1993) – Saltuar Leaf-tailed Geckos
Orraya (Couper, Covacevich, Schneider & Hoskin, 2000) – McIlwraith Leaf-tailed Gecko
Carphodactylus (Günther, 1897) – Australian Chameleon Gecko
Uvidicolus (Oliver & Bauer, 2011) – Border Thick-tailed Gecko
Underwoodisaurus (Wermuth, 1965) – Underwood's Geckos
Nephrurus (Günther, 1876) – Knob-tailed Geckos
Pygopodidae (Gray, 1845) – Flap-footed Geckos
Delma (Gray, 1831) – Delmas
Lialis (Gray, 1835) – Lialis
Ophidiocephalus (Lucas & Frost, 1897) – Bronzeback Snake-lizard
Pletholax (Cope, 1864) – Slender Slider
Aprasia (Gray, 1839) – Worm Geckos
Paradelma (Kinghorn, 1926) – Brigalow Scalyfoot
Pygopus (Merrem, 1820) – Scalyfeet

References

Geckos
Taxa named by John Edward Gray